David John Wales (born 1963) FRS FRSC is a professor of Chemical Physics, in the Department of Chemistry at the University of Cambridge.

Education
Wales was educated at Newport Free Grammar School followed by the University of Cambridge where he was awarded an open scholarship to study at
Gonville and Caius College, Cambridge receiving his BA degree in 1985. He went on to complete a PhD on cluster chemistry, awarded in 1988 for research supervised by Anthony J. Stone. In 2004 he was awarded a ScD degree from Cambridge.

Career and research
During 1989, Wales was an English-Speaking Union Lindemann Trust Fellow at the University of Chicago, doing postdoctoral research in collaboration with R. Stephen Berry. He returned to a research fellowship at Downing College, Cambridge in 1990, was a Lloyd's of London Tercentenary Fellow in 1991, and a Royal Society University Research Fellowship (URF) from 1991 to 1998. He was appointed a Lecturer in Cambridge in 1998, and Professor of Chemical Physics in 2008.

Wales' research investigates energy landscapes, with applications to chemical biology, spectroscopy, clusters, machine learning, solids and surfaces. Wales is the author of the textbook Energy Landscapes: Applications to Clusters, Biomolecules and Glasses and a co-author of Introduction to Cluster Chemistry with Michael Mingos.

His research has been funded by the European Research Council (Advanced Grant in 2010), the Engineering and Physical Sciences Research Council (EPSRC) and the Biotechnology and Biological Sciences Research Council (BBSRC).

Awards and honours
Wales was awarded the 
Cambridge University Norrish Prize for Chemistry and
the Gonville and Caius College Schuldham Plate in 1985, the
Meldola Medal and Prize in 1992 and the Tilden Prize in 2015, both by the Royal Society of Chemistry. He was a Baker Lecturer at Cornell University in 2005, the Inaugural Henry Frank Lecturer at the University of Pittsburgh in 2007, Distinguished Lecturer at the National Institute of Standards and Technology, USA in 2018, and was awarded a Visiting Miller Professorship at the University of California, Berkeley, for 2020. He was the first recipient of the  ICReDD Award, commemorating Professor Akira Suzuki, at Hokkaido University in 2020. Wales was elected a Fellow of the Royal Society (FRS) in 2016 and is also a Fellow of the Royal Society of Chemistry.
He received a Humboldt Research Prize from the Alexander von Humboldt Foundation in 2020.

Academic appointments
2020  International Chair, Institute for Artificial Intelligence, Cote d’Azur.
2017- Chair of the Theory Group, Department of Chemistry, Cambridge University.
2014 Telluride Science Research Centre 30th Anniversary Lecturer.
2013-2018 Institute for Molecular Science, Japan, International Advisory Board.
2012 Chair of Inaugural ESF Energy Landscapes Meeting.
2017 Visiting Professor, Universidad de La Laguna.
2011-2012 Visiting Professor, Université de Lyon.
2006 Visiting Professor, Boston University.
2006 Visiting Professor, Université Paul Sabatier, Toulouse.
1999 Visiting Professor, Université de Paris-Sud, Orsay.
1999 Visiting Professor, Harvard University.

References

1963 births
Living people
Fellows of the Royal Society
Fellows of the Royal Society of Chemistry
21st-century British chemists
20th-century British chemists